Betty George (April 11, 1926 – November 16, 2007) was an American singer of Greek descent. She was a soloist during the big band era.

Biography
George went to New York, where she sang with big bands including those of Artie Shaw, Glenn Miller, and Tommy Dorsey.

She worked for over 16 years with Milton Berle, and in 1953-1954 was a regular on The Jerry Lester Show, a variety program on ABC television.

Her Broadway credits include Ankles Aweigh (1955), As the Girls Go (1948), and Heaven on Earth (1948).

George recorded for Decca Records and CBS Studios.

References

1926 births
2007 deaths
People from Manchester, New Hampshire
American jazz singers
American people of Greek descent
20th-century American singers